Slängserud is a locality in Nyeds parish in the Karlstad Municipality, Värmland County. Located next to North Lake Barsjön. Slängserud consisting of parts Slängserudsgård and Slängserudstorp.

History 
In 1890, when The Swedish Census was so living there 73 people in Slängserud. Most of them worked with farming.

References 

Populated places in Värmland County